Ringicula is a genus of minute deepwater sea snails, marine gastropod mollusks or micromollusks belonging to the family Ringiculidae.

Species
The following species are included within the genus Ringicula:

 Ringicula abbreviata Nevill, 1875
 Ringicula abyssicola Brazier, 1877
 Ringicula acuta Philippi, 1849
 Ringicula aethiopica Martens, 1902
 Ringicula africana Bartsch, 1915
 Ringicula agulhasensis Thiele, 1925 
 † Ringicula altocanalis Dell, 1952 
 Ringicula apicata Nevill, 1872
  Ringicula arctata Gould, 1860
 Ringicula assularum Watson, 1883
 Ringicula auriculata (Ménard de la Groye, 1811)
 Ringicula australis Hinds, 1844µ
 Ringicula cabrai Morlet, 1882
 Ringicula caledonica Morlet, 1880
 † Ringicula castigata Marwick, 1926 
 Ringicula ciommeii Mariottini, Smriglio & Oliverio, 2000
 Ringicula conformis Monterosato, 1877
 Ringicula crassidens  Serge GOFAS, Ángel A. LUQUE, Joan Daniel OLIVER,José TEMPLADO & Alberto SERRA, 2021
 Ringicula delecta Murdoch & Suter, 1906
 Ringicula doliaris Gould, 1860 
 † Ringicula dominicana Maury, 1917
 Ringicula fossulata de Folin, 1867
 Ringicula gianninii Nordsieck, 1974
 Ringicula gouldi Robba, Di Geronimo, Chaimanee, Negri & Sanfilippo, 2004
 Ringicula grandinosa Hinds, 1844
 Ringicula hardingi Cotton & Godfrey, 1933
 Ringicula incisa Hedley, 1899
 Ringicula kurodai Takeyama, 1935
 † Ringicula leptocheila Brugnone, 1873
 Ringicula mariei Morlet, 1880
 † Ringicula marwicki Powell, 1935
 Ringicula minutula Locard, 1897
 † Ringicula ngatapa Marwick, 1931
 Ringicula niinoi Nomura, 1939
 Ringicula nitida A. E. Verrill, 1872
 Ringicula noumeensis Morlet, 1880
 † Ringicula obesior Marwick, 1931
 Ringicula okadai Habe, 1956
 Ringicula orientalis Lin, 1985
 Ringicula parvula Hedley, 1899
 Ringicula pilula Habe, 1950
 Ringicula pirulina Locard, 1897
 Ringicula plicifera Schepman, 1913
 Ringicula propinquans Hinds, 1844
 Ringicula pulchella Morlet, 1880
 Ringicula pusilla Watson, 1883
 Ringicula scalaris Turton, 1932
 Ringicula semisculpta Hedley, 1910
 Ringicula semistriata d’Orbigny, 1842
 Ringicula shenzhenensis Lin & Qi, 1986
 Ringicula soa Bozzetti, 2009
 Ringicula solida Turton, 1932
 Ringicula suturalis E. A. Smith, 1872
 Ringicula takeyamai Habe, 1950
 † Ringicula tenuilabrum Maxwell, 1992
 Ringicula teramachii Habe, 1950
 Ringicula titanica Schepman, 1913
 † Ringicula torquata Marwick, 1931
 Ringicula tosaensis Habe, 1950
 Ringicula truncata G. B. Sowerby III, 1915
 Ringicula turtoni Bartsch, 1915 
 † Ringicula tutamoensis Marwick, 1931
 † Ringicula uniplicata Hutton, 1885 
 Ringicula yokoyamai Takeyama, 1935
 † Ringicula zecorpulenta Laws, 1939 

Taxa inquirenda
 Ringicula abyssorum Morlet, 1882
 Ringicula admirabilis Morlet, 1882 
 Ringicula passieri Morlet, 1880
 Ringicula salleana Morlet, 1880
 Ringicula schlumbergeri Morlet, 1882 
 Ringicula terquemi Morlet, 1880 
Species brought into synonymy
 Ringicula acutispira Turton, 1932: synonym of Auriculastra radiolata (Morelet, 1860)
 Ringicula barashi Di Geronimo, 1975: synonym of Ringicula conformis Monterosato, 1877
 Ringicula blanchardi Dautzenberg & H. Fischer, 1896: synonym of Ringicula pulchella Morlet, 1880
 Ringicula doliaris Takeyama, 1935: synonym of Ringicula niinoi Nomura, 1939
 Ringicula hypograpta Brown & Pilsbry, 1913: synonym of Ringicula semistriata d'Orbigny, 1842
 Ringicula leptocheila Brugnone, 1873: synonym of Ringicula gianninii Nordsieck, 1974
 Ringicula moritzi de Folin, 1870: synonym of Ringicula conformis Monterosato, 1877
 Ringicula musashiensis Yokoyama, 1920: synonym of Ringicula doliaris Gould, 1860
 Ringicula oehlertiana Morelet, 1880: synonym of Ringicula doliaris Gould, 1860
 Ringicula peracuta Watson, 1883: synonym of Ringicula nitida A. E. Verrill, 1872
 Ringicula someri de Folin, 1867: synonym of Ringicula conformis Monterosato, 1877
 Ringicula tridentata Guppy, 1873: synonym of Ringicula semistriata d'Orbigny, 1842

References

 Vaught, K.C. (1989). A classification of the living Mollusca. American Malacologists: Melbourne, FL (USA). . XII, 195 pp.
 Gofas, S.; Le Renard, J.; Bouchet, P. (2001). Mollusca, in: Costello, M.J. et al. (Ed.) (2001). European register of marine species: a check-list of the marine species in Europe and a bibliography of guides to their identification. Collection Patrimoines Naturels, 50: pp. 180–213
 Spencer, H.; Marshall. B. (2009). All Mollusca except Opisthobranchia. In: Gordon, D. (Ed.) (2009). New Zealand Inventory of Biodiversity. Volume One: Kingdom Animalia. 584 pp

External links
  Serge GOFAS, Ángel A. LUQUE, Joan Daniel OLIVER,José TEMPLADO & Alberto SERRA (2021) - The Mollusca of Galicia Bank (NE Atlantic Ocean); European Journal of Taxonomy 785: 1–114

Ringiculidae
Gastropod genera